The Forrestal Range is a largely snow-covered mountain range, about  long, standing east of Dufek Massif and the Neptune Range in the Pensacola Mountains of Antarctica. Discovered and photographed on 13 January 1956 on a transcontinental patrol plane flight of U.S. Navy Operation Deep Freeze I from McMurdo Sound to the vicinity of the Weddell Sea and return.

Named by the US-ACAN after , first supercarrier of the U.S. Navy. The entire Pensacola Mountains were mapped by USGS in 1967 and 1968 from U.S. Navy tricamera aerial photographs taken in 1964.

Key mountains 
 Abele Spur is a rock spur that descends west from Mount Lechner toward the Herring Nunataks. It was named by US-ACAN at the suggestion of Arthur B. Ford for Gunars Abele, civil engineer on the 1973–1974 United States Antarctic Research Program (USARP)-CRREL survey in this area.
Discovered and photographed on January 13, 1956 during a U.S. Navy transcontinental nonstop plane flight from McMurdo Sound to Weddell Sea and return. Named by US-ACAN for Hartford E. Blount, aviation machinists mate with U.S. Navy Squadron VX during Operation Deep Freeze, 1956.
 Cooke Crags are rock crags on the ice slope between Henderson Bluff and Mount Lechner on the west side of Lexington Table. The area was mapped by USGS from surveys and U.S. Navy aerial photographs, 1956–1966. Named by US-ACAN in 1979 after James E. Cooke, USGS geophysicist who worked in Forrestal Range and Dufek Massif, 1978–1979.
 Mount Lechner  is a prominent mountain, surmounting the southwest end of Saratoga Table. Mapped by USGS from surveys and U.S. Navy air photos, 1956–1966. Named by US-ACAN for Major Ralph C. Lechner, USA, airlift coordinator on the staff of the Commander, U.S. Naval Support Force, Antarctica, 1964–1966.
Mapped by USGS in 1967 from ground surveys and U.S. Navy aerial photographs taken 1964. Named in 1979 by US-ACAN after Raymond D. Watts, USGS geophysicist who worked in the Forrestal Range and Dufek Massif, 1978–1979.
Mapped by USGS from surveys and U.S. Navy air photos, 1956–1966. Named by US-ACAN for Commander Charles F. Zirzow, U.S. Navy, Assistant Chief of Staff to the Commander, U.S. Naval Support Force, Antarctica, 1966–1967.

Key geographical features 
Discovered and photographed on January 13, 1956 on a transcontinental nonstop flight by personnel of U.S. Navy Operation Deep Freeze I from McMurdo Sound to the vicinity of Weddell Sea and return.
Discovered and photographed on January 13, 1956 on a transcontinental nonstop flight by personnel of U.S. Navy Operation Deep Freeze I from McMurdo Sound to the vicinity of Weddell Sea and return.

Features
Geographical features include:

 Ackerman Nunatak
 Beiszer Nunatak
 Burmester Dome
 Butler Rocks
 Camp Spur
 Chambers Glacier
 Coal Rock
 Creaney Nunataks
 Crouse Spur
 Dyrdal Peak
 Erlanger Spur
 Fierle Peak
 Ford Ice Piedmont
 Franko Escarpment
 Gabbro Crest
 Grob Ridge
 Haskill Nunatak
 Henderson Bluff
 Herring Nunataks
 Hodge Escarpment
 Huie Cliffs
 Kent Gap
 Kovacs Glacier
 Lance Rocks
 Larson Nunataks
 Magnetite Bluff
 Mathis Spur
 May Valley
 McCauley Rock
 Median Snowfield
 Mount Hook
 Mount Hummer
 Mount Malville
 Mount Mann
 Mount Stephens
 Ray Nunatak
 Ritala Spur
 Ronald Rock
 Sallee Snowfield
 Sheriff Cliffs
 Skidmore Cliff
 Sorna Bluff
 Support Force Glacier
 Thompo Icefall
 Vanguard Nunatak
 Vigen Cliffs

References

Mountain ranges of Queen Elizabeth Land
.
Transantarctic Mountains